Prince Nakkhatra Mangala, 2nd Prince of Chanthaburi (4 January 1898 – 11 February 1953), was the eldest son of Kitiyakara Voralaksana, 1st Prince of Chanthaburi and Princess Apsarasaman Kitiyakara.

Education
Prince Nakkhatra Mangala received primary education at the royal palace, then studied at the King's College under the royal patronage. Until 1910, he studied at the Royal Thai Army Cadet Academy.

In 1911, he went to study in England being a student under the Ministry of Defence in 1914, attending high school in france until receiving the Baccalauréat certificate in both areas in science. He then attended the French cadet academy École spéciale militaire de Saint-Cyr where he received the ranks of lieutenant and sergeant in the French army.

Careers
In 1920 he completed his studies in France. King Rama VI bestowed a second lieutenant on July 29, 1920 as a king guard under the 1st Infantry Regiment. Later, on January 27, 1922 King Rama VI bestowed the rank of lieutenant while studying military school in France. He also served in several French infantry regiments.

On June 29, 1931, he was graciously pleased to hold a position Assistant Chief of Staff for the Royal Thai Army.

In 1932, he retired from military officer then moved to serve in the Ministry of Foreign Affairs in the position of first secretary position at the Royal Thai Embassy Washington two years later he resigned from his post and returned to Thailand. During this time, He studied various academic fields such as history, astrology and literature.

Prince Nakkhatra Mangala represented the Ministry of Foreign Affairs as the ambassador of the kingdom of Thailand to the Court of St James's in the United Kingdom,  and to the government of France. He was the one who made his daughter, Mom Rajawongse Sirikit Kitiyakara fall in love with King Bhumibol Adulyadej by sending his daughter to help take care of the king when he was car accident in Switzerland in 1950.

After he arranges for his daughter to married with King Bhumibol Adulyadej, he was appointed as member of The Privy Council in Rama XI reign and promoted to rank General in Royal Thai Army.

Issue 
Prince Nakkhatra Mangala married with Mom Luang Bua Sanidvongs. There are 4 children as follows: Kalyanakit Kitiyakara, Adulakit Kitiyakara, Sirikit Kitiyakara and Busba Kitiyakara. Prince Nakkhatra Mangala was a key person who pushing the Kitiyakara family into being part of royal blood line, Mahidol family.

Death
He became ill with bronchitis in mid-January 1953 and still suffering from kidney until February 11, 1953 at 7.45 a.m., he died at the royal palace at the age of 55 years 1 month 8 days.

Ancestry

References

Thai male Phra Ong Chao
19th-century Chakri dynasty
20th-century Chakri dynasty
Kitiyakara family
Knights Grand Cross of the Order of Chula Chom Klao
Recipients of the Dushdi Mala Medal, Pin of Arts and Science
1898 births
1953 deaths
Deaths from kidney disease
Members of the Privy Council of Thailand